Khalifa is a compilation album by American rapper Wiz Khalifa. It was released on February 5, 2016, by Atlantic Records and Rostrum Records, serving as his fourth release with Atlantic. The project features guest appearances from Courtney Noelle, Travis Scott, J.R. Donato, Chevy Woods, Juicy J, Ty Dolla Sign, Rico Love and Wiz's son Sebastian. The production on the project was provided by Wiz's frequent collaborators such as I.D. Labs and Sledgren, alongside the additional production by Lex Luger, DJ Spinz, Jim Jonsin, Juicy J, among others.

The project was supported by the release lead and only single, "Bake Sale" featuring American rapper and singer Travis Scott. The project was preceded the release by the accompanied music videos for tracks such as "Zoney", "Elevated", "Celebrate" and "Most of Us".

Background
On January 10, 2016, Wiz Khalifa announced the title to his new project: Khalifa. Khalifa also explained that the project would largely consist of older unreleased songs that were recorded for his previous albums. No physical copies of the project were made.

Singles
The project's lead single, "Bake Sale", was released for purchase and streaming on January 21, 2016. The song features a guest appearance from American rapper Travis Scott, while the production was provided by TM88, Juicy J, Lex Luger, DJ Spinz and Crazy Mike. In December 2015, Wiz Khalifa previewed that track and then announced that the song would be included on his new project, Khalifa. This familiar instrumental for the song was once appeared on the other song "Order More" by G-Eazy, which was included on his album When It's Dark Out (2015). Due to ownership issues, Juicy J re-created the beat on the song for Wiz Khalifa, along with these co-producers. On the chart dated on February 13, 2016, it debuted and peaked at number 56 on the US Billboard Hot 100.

Critical reception

Upon its release, Khalifa was met with generally mixed reviews from music critics. At Metacritic, which assigns a normalized rating out of 100 to reviews from critics, the album received an average score of 56, which indicates "mixed or average reviews", based on 7 reviews. Chris Gibbons of Exclaim! said, "Khalifa likely won't sway opinion of Wiz Khalifa, whether positive or negative. For better or worse, it's a portrait of the rapper we've seen for years. It does do things a little more consistently and adds a little more detail than what we're used to seeing." Kris Ex of Billboard said, "On Khalifa, he's characteristically mellow and melodic, mixing rhymes that are part equal parts braggadocio and motivational slogans in an almost singular pursuit of highs and riches. By design, none of the songs stand out, save for the Travis Scott featuring 'Bake Sale', which wins mostly by sounding like an aired-out version of Scott's own hit 'Antidote'." David Jeffries of AllMusic questioned the exclusion of "See You Again" and said, "These expansive cuts surely benefit the Wiz discography, and will do best when shuffled into his canon, but lump them together into one LP and take away the driving influence and Khalifa feels more like part of a continuum than a self-contained statement."

Commercial performance 
Khalifa debuted at number six on the US Billboard 200, with 64,000 album-equivalent units; it sold 45,000 copies in its first week, boasting over 19.8 million streams. Khalifa became Khalifa's fourth consecutive top-ten debut on the Billboard 200.

Track listing

Charts

Weekly charts

Year-end charts

Release history

References

2016 albums
Albums produced by Jim Jonsin
Albums produced by Juicy J
Albums produced by Lex Luger
Rostrum Records albums
Wiz Khalifa albums
Albums produced by TM88